Kumari Padmini, born as Padmini (died 1980), was an actress who was active in Tamil, Telugu, and Malayalam industry during the 1960s and 70s.

Bio
Kumari Padmini acted mainly in Tamil films. She was also popular in Telugu and Malayalam films. She died by suicide.

Partial filmography
 Chitrangi (1964)                                    
 Neela Vaanam (1965)
 Annavin Aasai (1966)
 Ragasiya Police 115 (1968)
 Athai Magal (1969)
 Vaa Raja Vaa (1969)
 Dharisanam (1970)
 Thirumalai Thenkumari (1970)
 Kankaatchi (1971)
 Agathiyar (1972)
 Dharmam Engey (1972)
 Vasantha Maligai (1972)
 Deiva Kuzhandhaigal (1973)
 Karaikkal Ammaiyar (1973)
 Kasi Yathirai (1973)
 Nalla Mudivu (1973)
 Rajaraja Cholan (1973)
 Rajapart Rangadurai (1973)
 School Master (1973)
 Veetu Mapillai (1973)
 Devi Sri Karumari Amman (1974)
 Kadavul Mama (1974)
 Roshakkari (1974)
 Thaai (1974)
 Andharangam (1975)
 Hotel Sorgam (1975)
 Ippadiyum Oru Penn (1975)
 Thiyaga Ullam  (1975)
 Inspector Manaivi (1976)
 Avargal (1977)

References

1980 deaths
Actresses in Malayalam theatre
Tamil actresses
Telugu actresses
Actresses in Tamil cinema
Actresses in Malayalam cinema